Canthyporus is a genus of beetles in the family Dytiscidae, containing the following species:

 Canthyporus aenigmaticus Biström & Nilsson, 2006
 Canthyporus alpestris Guignot, 1936
 Canthyporus alvei Omer-Cooper, 1965
 Canthyporus angustatus Omer-Cooper, 1965
 Canthyporus bicinctus (Régimbart, 1895)
 Canthyporus brincki Omer-Cooper, 1965
 Canthyporus canthydroides (Régimbart, 1895)
 Canthyporus congener Omer-Cooper, 1956
 Canthyporus consuetus Omer-Cooper, 1965
 Canthyporus cooperae Guignot, 1951
 Canthyporus exilis (Boheman, 1848)
 Canthyporus fluviatilis Omer-Cooper, 1956
 Canthyporus guignoti Omer-Cooper, 1956
 Canthyporus guttatus Omer-Cooper, 1956
 Canthyporus hottentottus (Gemminger & Harold, 1868)
 Canthyporus hynesi Nilsson, 1991
 Canthyporus kenyensis Bilardo & Sanfilippo, 1979
 Canthyporus lateralis (Boheman, 1848)
 Canthyporus latus Omer-Cooper, 1965
 Canthyporus loeffleri Wewalka, 1981
 Canthyporus lowryi Omer-Cooper, 1965
 Canthyporus navigator Guignot, 1951
 Canthyporus nebulosus Omer-Cooper, 1965
 Canthyporus nimius Biström & Nilsson, 2006
 Canthyporus parvus Omer-Cooper, 1955
 Canthyporus pauliani Guignot, 1951
 Canthyporus petulans Guignot, 1951
 Canthyporus planus Omer-Cooper, 1965
 Canthyporus regimbarti Nilsson, 2001
 Canthyporus sigillatus (Guignot, 1955)
 Canthyporus subparallelus Guignot, 1956
 Canthyporus swaziensis Omer-Cooper, 1956
 Canthyporus testaceus Zimmermann, 1923
 Canthyporus turneri Biström & Nilsson, 2006
 Canthyporus wewalkai Biström & Nilsson, 2006

References 

Dytiscidae genera